is a 2015 Japanese animated film produced by Kyoto Animation and Animation Do. The plot is loosely based on the second volume of the High Speed! light novels by Koji Oji, the series that inspired the Free! animated series. The film centers on Haruka Nanase as a junior high student, where he and his friends learn the meaning of teamwork as they join the swim team.

High Speed! Free! Starting Days was released nationwide in Japanese theaters on December 5, 2015 to moderate success, ranking #5 on its opening weekend and being nominated for Best Picture in the Newtype Anime Awards. Funimation has licensed the film for North American release in 2018 along with Free! Timeless Medley and Free! Take Your Marks.

Plot

Haruka Nanase begins his first year at Iwatobi Middle School. After discovering that Haruka and his childhood friend, Makoto Tachibana, had once been part of the Iwatobi Swim Club, Asahi Shiina urges them to join the swim team despite Haruka's lack of interest, while Kisumi Shigino suggests they join the basketball team. Natsuya Kirishima, the captain of the swim team, visits their class and successfully convinces Haruka, Makoto, Asahi, and his younger brother Ikuya to join.

At the first swim practice, Haruka ties Natsuya in a race for the right to swim only freestyle. Asahi, however, loses confidence in swimming. Ikuya, frustrated over Natsuya's admiration of Haruka's skill, begins to imitate Haruka in hopes of gaining his brother's attention again. Nao Serizawa, the vice captain, asks Makoto if he enjoys swimming or is only in the club to be with Haruka, confusing Makoto and putting distance between the best friends. The team's individual struggles affect their performance, especially during the team medley. Later, Haruka's mother leaves for a week, leaving Haruka on his own.

During a joint practice with Sano Middle School, Sosuke Yamazaki challenges Haruka to a match race, having heard about him from Rin Matsuoka, Haruka's rival. However, Iwatobi loses the team medley, leaving him disappointed as he gives him Rin's letter. As Iwatobi's swim team mulls over their defeat, Haruka confronts Makoto about his uncharacteristic behavior, to which Makoto realizes that he loves swimming and Haruka equally, restoring their bond. The next day, Ikuya threatens to quit the team and confides to Haruka, Makoto, and Asahi about feeling lonely and abandoned by Natsuya. After affirming their friendships, Ikuya makes amends with him. When the four visit Nao, who is getting surgery for a detached retina, he offers them advice on their strengths as individuals and as a team, giving them hope. On the way home, however, Haruka faints, leading Makoto, Asahi, and Ikuya to stay at his house until his mother returns.

At the prefectural tournament, Haruka, Makoto, Asahi, and Ikuya place first in the team medley. Afterwards, Sosuke tells Haruka that while Rin's letter was addressed to him, it was probably meant for Haruka instead. The letter details the setbacks Rin has faced in Australia and his desire to swim like Haruka. With this in mind, Haruka becomes determined to become a better swimmer with his team.

Production

Eternal Summer Special Event. The film is a loose adaptation of the second volume, which was also penned by Oji.

Several cast members from the television series returned to reprise their roles, including Nobunaga Shimazaki, Tatsuhisa Suzuki, Mamoru Miyano, and Yoshimasa Hosoya. Yasuhiro Takemoto was announced as the director of the film, while several staff members who had worked on the television series returned, including head writer Masahiro Yokotani, art director Joji Unogochi, soundtrack composer Tatsuya Kato, among others. In September 2015, the film's official website had announced new additions to the cast, including Toshiyuki Toyonaga as Asahi, Kouki Uchiyama as Ikuya, Kenji Nojima as Natsuya, and Satoshi Hino as Nao. Nagisa Hazuki and Rei Ryugazaki, two characters from the main cast of the original Free! series, appear in the film with minor roles.

High Speed! Free! Starting Days was released in theaters on December 5, 2015. The film's theme song, "Aching Horns", was performed by Oldcodex. The song was released as a single on December 18, 2015. It debuted at #10 on Oricon and charted for eight weeks. Funimation acquired the rights for High Speed! Free! Starting Days for distribution in North America, along with the Free! Timeless Medley movie trilogy, including Free! Take Your Marks. All films were released as a set in October 2018.

Reception

High Speed! Free! Starting Days opened at #5 in 120 theaters nationwide, selling 60,729 tickets in the first two days and earning . The film made ¥691 million at box office.

The home release debuted at #1 on both Oricon's DVD and Blu-ray charts. The limited edition of the Blu-ray release sold 14,642 copies on its first week. The limited edition of the DVD release debuted at #1 with 9,677 copies sold on its first week, while the regular edition debuted at #13 with 822 DVDs sold.

High Speed! Free! Starting Days ranked #5 in Best Picture in the 2015-2016 Newtype Anime Awards. The film also ranked #3 in Animation of the Year by fans for the 2017 Tokyo Anime Award, with a total of 16,094 votes.

Soundtrack

The original soundtrack was produced by Tatsuya Kato, and it was released on December 16, 2015 under the name . The soundtrack debuted at #42 on Oricon and charted for three weeks.

Media

Manga

To promote the film, a manga adaptation of High Speed! was released, with artwork provided by Shiori Teshirogi.

Drama CD

A drama CD titled  was released on February 17, 2016, with cast members reprising their roles. The CD debuted at #13 on the Oricon Weekly Albums Chart.

References

External links
 

2010s Japanese films
2015 anime films
Animated films based on animated series
Japanese film series
2010s Japanese-language films
Funimation
Kyoto Animation
Films set in Tottori Prefecture